Cryosophila warscewiczii is a species of flowering plant in the family Arecaceae, endemic to Central America. It is a tree with palmate leaves, growing to 10 meters in height with trunk 10–15 cm. in diameter above its enlarged base. Much of the trunk bears spines transformed from roots.

Synonyms
 Acanthorrhiza warscewiczii H.Wendl.	
 Cryosophila albida

References
 Palmpedia entry  Downloaded on 23 June 2013.
 The Plant List entry
 Smithsonian Herbarium entry

warscewiczii